Joachim Schwabe (born 24 August 1983) is a German former footballer who played as a defender.

Career
Schwabe made his professional debut in the 3. Liga for VfB Stuttgart II on 2 August 2008, starting in the away match against Union Berlin which finished as a 1–3 loss.

References

External links
 Profile at DFB.de
 Profile at kicker.de

1983 births
Living people
Sportspeople from Jena
People from Bezirk Gera
Footballers from Thuringia
German footballers
Association football defenders
FC Carl Zeiss Jena players
VfB Stuttgart II players
3. Liga players
Regionalliga players